These are lists of the 100 known verified oldest people sorted in descending order by age in years and days.

The oldest person ever whose age has been independently verified is Jeanne Calment (1875–1997) of France, who lived to the age of 122 years and 164 days. The oldest verified man ever is Jiroemon Kimura (1897–2013) of Japan, who lived to the age of 116 years and 54 days.

The oldest known living person is Maria Branyas of Spain, aged . The oldest known living man is Juan Vicente Pérez of Venezuela, aged . The 100 oldest women have, on average, lived several years longer than the 100 oldest men.



100 verified oldest women
The list including known and validated supercentenarians who died before 2015 was compiled by the Gerontology Research Group (GRG). Later cases are included in more recent GRG data, with administrative reports or press coverage as supplementary sources, as indicated in the table.

100 verified oldest men 

The list including all known and validated supercentenarians who died before 2015 was compiled by the Gerontology Research Group (GRG). Later cases are sourced either from more recent GRG data, from administrative reports, or from press coverage. From 2017 most cases have not been verified by an organization specializing in age verification, such as the GRG, unless they are aged 113+.

References

Lists of supercentenarians